Magic Funhouse! is an American comedy-drama created by Brandon Rogers. The series stars Rogers as Arlo Dittman, the host of a children's television show called Magic Funhouse!, and Jess Weaver as Dave Rowland, the new production assistant on the show.

Announced on June 7, 2016, the first season premiered later that year on December 15, 2016, on Fullscreen, and concluded on January 19, 2017. That same year, the series was renewed for a second season, which premiered on August 24, 2017, and concluded on September 28, 2017. Following the removal of streaming services on Fullscreen, the series was canceled in 2018.

Premise

Cast

Main
 Brandon Rogers as Arlo Dittman, the host of Magic Funhouse! who portrays Mr. Marble on the show
 Jess Weaver as Dave Rowland, the production assistant of Magic Funhouse!
 TJ Smith as Cliff, a porn actor who portrays Officer McSafety on Magic Funhouse!
 Elise Christian as Sacha, a wannabe-singer and actress on Magic Funhouse!
 Alex Diehl as Jimmy, a convicted child molester and pedophile who works as the receptionist for Magic Funhouse!
 Nandini Minocha as Manjusha, the camerawoman for Magic Funhouse! and Arlo's assistant
 Jude B. Lanston as Leslie Chronis, the network head of TV30, the production company that created Magic Funhouse!

Recurring
 Paulette Jones as Mrs. Bory, a senile woman who takes care of Arlo from time to time (season 1-2)
 Monique Parent as Cordula Sweetzer, the president of HipDot Television (season 2)

Episodes

Season 1
In the following list, the term "featured character" refers to the character who voices over the episode while testifying in court.

Season 2

Production
In February 2016, future series creator and director Brandon Rogers was given the opportunity to create his own TV series for Super Deluxe. While writing for the show's first season, Rogers stated that his inspiration for the series was "loosely based on an actual public access TV station that had low-budget shows to entertain the Tri-Valley locals." He also mentioned that the show was set in Rogers' home town of Livermore, California. Principal photography for the first season of the show began on May 18, 2016 and concluded on October 15, 2016. The series was mainly filmed in Hollywood. Principal photography for the second season took place between April 3 and June 13, 2017.

Accolades

References

External links
 

2010s American comedy-drama television series
2016 American television series debuts
2017 American television series endings
Television series about show business
Television series about actors
Television series about revenge
Television series about television
Television series about orphans
Television shows about clowns
Television series about Nazis
Television shows filmed in Los Angeles
Streamy Award winners